Issac Bailey is a professor at Davidson College, former columnist, and author in United States. He wrote a column for The Sun News in Myrtle Beach, South Carolina. He wrote a book about growing up with a brother  and a book of essays Why Didn't We Riot?  A Black Man in Trumpland.

He graduated from Davidson College in 1995. He is a professor of Public Policy at Davidson.

Books
Why Didn't We Riot?  A Black Man in Trumpland
My Brother Moochie: Regaining Dignity in the Face of Crime, Poverty, and Racism in the American South (2018)

References

External links
Op-eds

Year of birth missing (living people)
Living people
Davidson College alumni
Davidson College faculty